National Autonomous University may refer to:
 National Autonomous University of Honduras, main campus in Tegucigalpa
 National Autonomous University of Mexico, Mexico City
 National Autonomous University of Nicaragua, León and Managua